The Roman Catholic Archdiocese of Taipei is a diocese of the Roman Catholic Church in Taiwan. Pope Pius XII erected it as the Apostolic Prefecture of Taipei on 30 December 1949.  On 7 August 1952, it was elevated to an archdiocese, with the suffragan sees of Chiayi, Hsinchu, Hualien, Kaohsiung, Taichung, and Tainan.

The archdiocese's cathedral is the Cathedral of the Immaculate Conception. As the only metropolitan in Taiwan, it is the principal episcopal see of that country. Pope Francis accepted the mandatory resignation of John Hung Shan-chuan upon reaching retirement age and appointed Thomas Chung An-zu as Archbishop of Taipei on 23 May 2020. For many years, each person appointed Archbishop of Taipei has also been appointed as Apostolic Administrator of the Kinmen and Matsu islands, which form part of the Diocese of Xiamen.

List of Ordinaries of Taipei
Joseph Kuo Joshih (13 June 1950 Appointed – 4 December 1959 Resigned)
Cardinal Thomas Tien Ken-Sin (Apostolic Administrator, 16 December 1959 Appointed – 15 February 1966 Retired)
Stanislaus Lo Kuang (15 February 1966 Appointed – 5 August 1978 Resigned)
Matthew Kia Yen-Wen (15 November 1978 Appointed – 11 February 1989 Resigned)
Joseph Ti-kang (11 February 1989 Succeeded – 24 January 2004 Retired)
Joseph Cheng Tsai-fa (24 January 2004 Appointed – 9 November 2007 Retired)
John Hung Shan-Chuan (9 November 2007 Appointed – 23 May 2020 Retired)
Thomas Chung An-Zu (23 May 2020 Appointed – present)

See also

 Roman Catholicism in Taiwan
 List of Roman Catholic dioceses in Taiwan

References

External links
Catholic Archdiocese of Taipei 
Catholic-Hierarchy
GCatholic.org

Christian organizations established in 1949
Roman Catholic dioceses in Taiwan
Roman Catholic Archdiocese
Roman Catholic dioceses and prelatures established in the 20th century
1949 establishments in Taiwan